Dolfin may refer to:

People
Dolfin of Carlisle, 11th century Northumbrian magnate
Delfini (family) (also spelled Delfin), an ancient noble Venetian family
Caterina Dolfin (1736-1793), Venetian poet
Daniele and Dionigio Dolfin, last and second-to-last head of the Patriarchate of Aquileia respectively
Dolfin Dolfin, a Venetian nobleman who played a role in the 1453 siege of Constantinople
Giampaolo Dolfin, (1736-1819) a Roman Catholic bishop
Giovanni Dolfin (died 1361), 57th Doge of Venice

Other uses
Dolfin Swimwear, an aquatic sportswear manufacturer
DOLFIN, main interface to the software FEniCS Project

See also
Dolphin